Justina Baltrūnaitė (born 10 January 1999) is a Lithuanian footballer who plays as a midfielder for A Lyga club FK Kauno Žalgiris and the Lithuania women's national team.

International career
Baltrūnaitė capped for Lithuania at senior level in a 1–0 away friendly win against Armenia on 4 March 2020.

References

1999 births
Living people
Women's association football midfielders
Lithuanian women's footballers
Lithuania women's international footballers
Lithuanian women's futsal players